Carrot cake is cake that contains carrots mixed into the batter.

Carrot cake may also refer to:
Turnip cake, a type of Cantonese dim sum called carrot cake in Singapore
Chai tow kway, a type of dim sum also known as fried carrot cake